Mąkolno may refer to the following places in Poland:
Mąkolno, Lower Silesian Voivodeship (south-west Poland)
Mąkolno, Greater Poland Voivodeship (west-central Poland)